The Prophecies of Nostradamus (also known as The Man Who Saw Tomorrow) is a 1979 Australian made-for-TV documentary film based on the writings of Nostradamus. Produced for (7) Network Australia, the film is hosted by actor John Waters and narrated by Kirk Alexander.

References

External links
 

Australian television films
1979 television films
1979 films
1970s English-language films
1970s Australian films